4-Isopropylphenol is an organic compound with the formula .  The molecule consists of an isopropyl group affixed to the para (p-) position of phenol. The compound, a white solid, is produced by the alkylation of phenol with propylene and is relevant to the production of the commodity chemical bisphenol A (BPA).  The preparation of isopropylphenols by alkylation of phenol and various cresols with propylene has been well developed.  Depending on the catalysts and conditions, products can include, aside from 4-isopropylphenol, 2-isopropylphenol, 2,6-diisopropylphenol, and 2,4,6-2-triisopropylphenol.

The compound undergoes catalytic dehydrogenation to give p-isopropenylphenol.

References

Alkylphenols